The Parpaner Rothorn is a mountain of the Plessur Alps, overlooking Parpan in the canton of Graubünden. The summit is easily accessible with a cable car from Lenzerheide, the upper station being located 30 metres below the main summit.

See also
List of mountains of Switzerland accessible by public transport

References

External links
 Parpaner Rothorn on Hikr

Mountains of the Alps
Mountains of Switzerland
Mountains of Graubünden
Arosa
Vaz/Obervaz